The Faith Healer is a lost 1921 American silent drama film directed by George Melford and written by Z. Wall Covington and Mrs. William Vaughn Moody from William Vaughn Moody's play. The film stars Milton Sills, Ann Forrest, Fontaine La Rue, Frederick Vroom, Loyola O'Connor, Mae Giraci, and John Curry. The film was released on March 13, 1921, by Paramount Pictures.

Plot
Rhoda Williams is an orphan and the mistress of Dr. Littlefield. She sees a disabled man restored to good health by Michaelis a young shepherd with the power of faith healing. She summons Michaelis to her disabled aunt's house, he cures the woman of her paralysis problem, and Rhoda tells him of her difficult life. After that, Michaelis falls in love with her. Later, he is called to cure a woman's sick baby, but he fails to do that. He thinks that his power loss is a result of his love for Rhoda. In the end, she helps him see that the failure was only because of his lack of faith in the power of love. After he realizes that, he is able to restore the young child to full health.

Cast
Milton Sills as Michaelis
Ann Forrest as Rhoda Williams
Fontaine La Rue as Mary Beeler
Frederick Vroom as Matthew Beeler
Loyola O'Connor as Martha Beeler
Mae Giraci as Little Annie
John Curry as Uncle Abe
Adolphe Menjou as Dr. Littlefield
Edward Vroom as Dr. Sanchez
Robert Brower as Dr. Martin
Winifred Greenwood as A Mother

References

External links

1921 lost films
Silent American drama films
1921 drama films
Paramount Pictures films
Films directed by George Melford
American black-and-white films
American silent feature films
Lost American films
Lost drama films
1920s American films
1920s English-language films
Films about faith healing